Tian Jianquan is a Chinese wheelchair fencer. He represented China at the Summer Paralympics in 2008, 2012, 2016 and 2021 and in total he won one gold medal, four silver medals and four bronze medals.

References

External links 
 

Living people
Year of birth missing (living people)
Place of birth missing (living people)
Chinese male épée fencers
Chinese male sabre fencers
Wheelchair fencers at the 2008 Summer Paralympics
Wheelchair fencers at the 2012 Summer Paralympics
Wheelchair fencers at the 2016 Summer Paralympics
Wheelchair fencers at the 2020 Summer Paralympics
Medalists at the 2008 Summer Paralympics
Medalists at the 2012 Summer Paralympics
Medalists at the 2016 Summer Paralympics
Medalists at the 2020 Summer Paralympics
Paralympic gold medalists for China
Paralympic silver medalists for China
Paralympic bronze medalists for China
Paralympic medalists in wheelchair fencing
Paralympic wheelchair fencers of China
21st-century Chinese people